Dragoslav Šekularac (8 November 1937 – 5 January 2019) was a Serbian professional footballer and coach.

Nicknamed Šeki, he was quick and crafty with the ball, displaying creative skills which turned many heads. Possessing supreme self-confidence along with impeccable technical ability, he was one of the biggest showmen and crowd draws in the history of Yugoslav football. His enormous popularity throughout FPR Yugoslavia during the early 1960s transcended sports as he easily became one of the most recognizable individuals in the country. As a coach, he led several clubs in Canada, Colombia, Australia, Serbia, Mexico, and Spain, as well as the Guatemala national team in the 1986 FIFA World Cup qualification.

Šekularac is considered one of the most important players in the history of Red Star Belgrade: he is the second (and one of only five players) to have been awarded the Zvezdina zvezda status.

Early life
Šekularac was born on 8 November 1937 in Štip, Vardar Banovina, Kingdom of Yugoslavia to Montenegrin Serb father Bogosav from the village of Kurikuće, Berane Municipality (the Vasojevići region in northern Montenegro) and Macedonian mother Donka (née Markovska). His father was a lawyer whose job took him to Štip where he got married and started a family. Dragoslav was an infant when the family moved to Belgrade due to his father getting a job at the Ministry of Agriculture.

Šekularac was born bowlegged, much like Garrincha, a footballer who he was later often compared to. He took up footballing very early, right after World War II ended, and came up through the Red Star Belgrade youth system.

Club career

Red Star Belgrade
Šekularac made his senior debut at only 17 years of age on 6 March 1955 during the latter part of Red Star's 1954–55 league campaign under head coach Milovan Ćirić. The youngster would record only one more league appearance by the end of that season.

However, the next season, 1955–56, signaled immediate breakthrough. In addition to securing a spot in the first team, he also became an integral part of the squad that won the Yugoslav league title in convincing fashion. He contributed to the cause with 7 goals in addition to many eye-catching midfield displays that would soon become a staple of his game.

By the start of the 1956–57 season, eighteen-year-old Šekularac had already made his senior national team debut. And, in November and December 1956 during the league's winter break, he represented FPR Yugoslavia at the 1956 Melbourne Olympics. Despite added pressures and responsibilities, he turned in another stellar league season helping Red Star to another title. He also played an important part in Red Star's European Champions' Cup campaign that ended at semi-final stage versus AC Fiorentina.

All the success led to coach Ćirić receiving and taking the S.S. Lazio head coaching offer position. In his place came Miša Pavić who previously mentored Šekularac in the club's youth setup. The season was not much of a success, however, either team-wise or for Šekularac individually. Increased opponents' defensive focus multiplied the number of hits and knocks he was forced to endure during games. He battled injury problems that caused him to miss almost half of the season as Red Star quickly fell out of title contention.

Though the next 1958–59 season brought continued injury issues, Šekularac, by now a bona fide star across the league, managed to lead his team to league-cup double, both at the expense of arch-rival FK Partizan. In 1959 after winning the league and cup double with Red Star, Italian industrialist Gianni Agnelli spared no expense in order to bring 21-year-old Šekularac to Juventus. The transfer was reportedly stopped by the highest echelons of communist nomenclature in FPR Yugoslavia, with even the interior minister Aleksandar Ranković commenting that Šeki is needed in the country to "entertain the working class".

Šekularac is also remembered as the perpetrator of an infamous on-pitch incident in fall 1962 when he assaulted referee Pavle Tumbas in the middle of a league match. He ended up serving a year and a half long suspension.

He ended up playing 375 official competitive matches (156 of those in the league) for Red Star and scoring over 119 goals (32 league goals).

Playing abroad
He later played for Independiente Santa Fe in Colombia for five seasons, before transferring to Millonarios from Bogotá. He eventually ended his playing career in France with Paris FC and later on as a player-coach in Canada with the Serbian White Eagles in 1975. While playing in Colombia, he was referred to as el Pelé blanco (the white Pelé).

International career
At only 18, he made his national team debut on 30 September 1956. He was on the national side that won the silver medal at the 1956 Summer Olympics in Melbourne, Australia, and also participated in the World Cups of 1958 and 1962. He went on to make 41 senior international appearances, scoring 6 goals.

A highlight of his international career was the 1960 European Nations' Cup, where Šekularac earned the spot in the Team of the Tournament. Forty years later, he reminisced on the matches:
{{blockquote|text="Do I remember that match? To this day, I dream about it. We had a great team that won over the French fans. Against the home side, I took part in one of the best games in the history of football. I was convinced that the trophy would be in our hands. Against the Russians, we've never had luck. It was like that in the final match as well. I remember that we missed a few goal chances and that the Russians at times during the match were totally inferior. That Ponedelnik however was without mercy. He scored on us and prevented us from celebrating our (potentially) biggest triumph."|sign=|source=}}

Playing style
He was quick and crafty with the ball, displaying creative skills which turned many heads. Possessing supreme self-confidence along with impeccable technical ability, he was one of the biggest showmen and crowd draws in the history of Yugoslav football. His enormous popularity throughout FPR Yugoslavia during the early 1960s transcended sports as he easily became one of the most recognizable individuals in the country.

In addition to the swelling of praise and accolades for his skills, he also attracted criticism over lack of team play and overall attitude on the pitch that some found to be disrespectful to the game. Others point to his lack of effectiveness and a seeming disproportion between his talent and his overall career statistics.

Coaching career
Serbian White Eagles FC

In February 2006, prior to the start of the 2006 Canadian Soccer League season, it was announced that Šekularac would become head coach of the expansion Serbian White Eagles, re-founded in February of the same year, with first assistant being Stevan Mojsilović. This would be Šekularac's second stint with the White Eagles having already played for and coached them in the past. With seasoned internationals being brought over from Serbia and the rest of Europe, the team was set.

The stint, though short-lived, was not without success. The club was a hit in its first season, finishing first in the International Conference with 55 points and first overall (tallying both conferences). In the regular season, Šeki guided the club to 17 wins, 1 loss and 4 ties with a whopping goal differential of 66:13.

The Eagles advanced to the knockout-stage, easily beating Toronto Supra Portuguese in the quarterfinals with a score of 3-0 and also easily beating the Windsor Border Stars in the semifinal 6–1. The season was almost brought to a happy end but the Serbian White Eagles lost to the Italia Shooters in the final by a score of 1–0.

Personal life
Šekularac had a son named Marko and three daughters named Aleksandra (nicknamed Sanja), Ivana and Katja. He had a younger brother named Mirko (born 1941) who was also a footballer. Mirko’s grandson Kristian is also a professional footballer.

Along with Serbian, English and Spanish, Šekularac also spoke conversational Portuguese.

Šekularac was a keen chess player. At the age of 81, only weeks before his death, he drew his game in a simultaneous exhibition against Anatoly Karpov in Valjevo.

In popular culture
 Šekularac was probably the first sports superstar in Yugoslavia whose fame transcended sporting bounds. The popularity he enjoyed during his playing heyday was such that he even starred in a 1962 full-length comedy feature Šeki snima, pazi se – a football-related movie built around his public persona.
 In 2006, a biography of Šekularac titled Čovek za sva vremena (The All-Time Man) by Dušan Popović was published in Belgrade
 In 2011, Šekularac (along with Serbian sports journalist Jovo Vuković) wrote an autobiography titled Ja, Šeki'' (I, Šeki). The book was also published in Belgrade.

Death and legacy
Šekularac died on 5 January 2019 in Belgrade, Serbia. He is interred in the Alley of Distinguished Citizens in the Belgrade New Cemetery in a joint grave with Milunka Lazarević, next to the grave of actor Božidar Stošić and across the graves of Ranko Žeravica and Branislav Pokrajac.

The Serbian White Eagles Academy was posthumously named in his honour.

Honours

Player
Red Star Belgrade
Yugoslav First League: 1955–56, 1956–57, 1958–59, 1959–60, 1963–64
Yugoslav Cup: 1957–58, 1958–59, 1963–64
Independiente Santa Fe 
Categoría Primera A: 1971
Copa Simón Bolívar: 1970

Yugoslavia
Summer Olympics Second place: 1956
UEFA European Championship runner-up: 1960

Individual
UEFA European Championship Team of the Tournament: 1960

Manager
Red Star Belgrade

Yugoslav First League: 1989–90
Yugoslav Cup: 1989–90

Heidelberg United
NSL Cup: 1992–93

Serbian White Eagles 
Canadian Soccer League (International Division): 2006
Canadian Soccer League: 2006 (Play-offs) (runner-up)

References

External links
 Profile at reprezentacija.rs 
 NASL stats

1937 births
2019 deaths
Sportspeople from Štip
Serbs of North Macedonia
Serbian footballers
Serbian football managers
Red Star Belgrade footballers
Karlsruher SC players
OFK Beograd players
Independiente Santa Fe footballers
Millonarios F.C. players
América de Cali footballers
Serbian White Eagles FC players
Serbian White Eagles FC managers
Paris FC players
Yugoslav First League players
1958 FIFA World Cup players
1960 European Nations' Cup players
1962 FIFA World Cup players
Olympic footballers of Yugoslavia
Olympic silver medalists for Yugoslavia
Footballers at the 1956 Summer Olympics
Yugoslav footballers
Yugoslav expatriate footballers
Yugoslavia international footballers
Yugoslavia under-21 international footballers
Yugoslav football managers
National Professional Soccer League (1967) players
St. Louis Stars (soccer) players
Red Star Belgrade non-playing staff
Red Star Belgrade managers
Club América managers
FK Napredak Kruševac managers
FK Obilić managers
Serbian expatriate sportspeople in South Korea
Serbian expatriate footballers
Serbian people of Macedonian descent
Yugoslav expatriate sportspeople in Canada
Yugoslav expatriate sportspeople in the United States
Expatriate soccer players in Canada
Expatriate soccer players in the United States
Expatriate footballers in Colombia
Expatriate footballers in Germany
Expatriate footballers in West Germany
Expatriate football managers in Guatemala
Expatriate football managers in Mexico
Expatriate football managers in South Korea
Expatriate soccer managers in Canada
Serbian expatriate football managers
Yugoslav expatriate sportspeople in Colombia
Yugoslav expatriate sportspeople in Guatemala
Yugoslav expatriate sportspeople in Mexico
Guatemala national football team managers
Olympic medalists in football
Al Nassr FC managers
Busan IPark managers
Atlético Bucaramanga footballers
Serbian expatriate sportspeople in Canada
Canadian National Soccer League players
Canadian National Soccer League coaches
Canadian Soccer League (1998–present) managers
Medalists at the 1956 Summer Olympics
Association football midfielders
Association football player-managers
Burials at Belgrade New Cemetery